Griffith may refer to:

People
 Griffith (name)
 Griffith (surname)
 Griffith (given name)

Places

Antarctica
 Mount Griffith, Ross Dependency
 Griffith Peak (Antarctica), Marie Byrd Land
 Griffith Glacier, Marie Byrd Land
 Griffith Ridge, Victoria Land
 Griffith Nunataks, Victoria Land
 Griffith Island

Australia
 Griffith, New South Wales, a city
 City of Griffith, a local government area which includes Griffith, New South Wales
 Griffith, Australian Capital Territory, a suburb of Canberra
 Division of Griffith, a parliamentary electorate in Queensland

Canada
 Griffith Island (Georgian Bay), Ontario
 Griffith Island (Nunavut)

United States
 Griffith Park, a public park in Los Angeles, California
 Griffith, Indiana, a town and suburb of Chicago
 Griffith Lake, Vermont
 Griffith, Virginia, an unincorporated community
 Griffith Peak, Nevada
 Griffith Quarry, near Penryn, California

Education
 Griffith Institute, Oxford, Great Britain
 Griffith University, Queensland, Australia
 Griffith College Dublin, a private college
 Griffith College Cork, a private institution
 Griffith College Limerick, a private school
 Griffith High School, Griffith, New South Wales, Australia

Buildings
 Griffith Observatory in Los Angeles, California
 Griffith Mansion, Cacheville, California
 Griffith House (Aberdeen, Maryland)
 Griffith Building, Newark, New Jersey
 Griffith Stadium, sports stadium that once stood in Washington, D.C.
 Griffith Barracks, Dublin, Ireland, a former military barracks

Other uses
 Griffith baronets, two extinct titles
 TVR Griffith, TVR Griffith 200, and TVR Griffith 400 sports cars
 Griffith Laboratories, a manufacturer of food products based in Alsip, Illinois
 Griffith (Berserk), a character from the manga and anime Berserk

See also
 Griffiths, a surname
 Justice Griffith (disambiguation)